Paula Avila-Guillen is a Colombian lawyer, specialist in human rights, and sexual and reproductive rights activist in Latin America. Currently, she is the Execute Director of the Women's Equality Center. At La-WEC, she works and collaborate with Latin-American organizations and leaders who works for the reproductive freedom in the region, designing strategies such as legal defense tactics and communication campaigns.

Biography 
Paula was born in Bogotá, Colombia.She graduated as a Lawyer from the University of Los Andes and studied a Master's Degree in Law with an emphasis on Human Rights at the American University's Washington College of Law. In 2012, she was admitted at the New York State Bar.

Professional background

Women's Equality Center, WEC 
As Executive Director of WEC, she leads strategies, campaigns and tactics in search of eliminate the total abortion ban that exist all over Latin-America; allow emergency contraception and support local advocacy for women's rights in this world's region.​

Center of Reproductive Rights, CRR 
Between 2014 and 2016, Avila-Guillen worked as Advocacy Consultant for Latin-America in the Center of Reproductive Rights. In this position, she created and implemented legal defense strategies and identified opportunities to connect high level organizations (such as United Nations and Organization of American States) with the issues and problems that women addressed in terms of sexual and reproductive rights.

At CRR, she also worked with the Communications Team directing the strategy to hold El Salvador's government  accountable of the unfair decisions made about tens of women condemned for aggravated homicide and being imprisoned after suffering a miscarriage or having other kinds of obstetric emergencies. Her work has contributed to freed of more than 15 women and it still being applied by a coalition of organizations, including the  Women's Equality Center.

World Bank 
As Consultant of the World Bank, Avila-Guillen lead a specific work for the implications for the Human Rights with the Zika epidemic.

Publications and public speeches 
Paula Avila-Guillen has been published op-Eds and academic articles related to sexual and reproductive rights, health and public policies. She had also lectured in different institutions and universities such as Harvard University and Georgetown University.

As international spokeswoman about women's rights, she has been interviewed and quoted by different media such as The New York Times, The Washington Post, The Economist, Time Magazine, The Wall Street Journal, CNN , CNN en Español, NPR, Newsweek, NBC News, Al Jazeera, The Guardian, BBC World News, El País,The Huffington Post, The Miami Herald, BuzzFeed, and some others.

References

External links 

 Women's Equality Center

Colombian women lawyers
Abortion-rights activists
People from Bogotá
University of Los Andes (Colombia) alumni
American University alumni
Year of birth missing (living people)
Living people
21st-century Colombian lawyers